A. L. Williams may refer to:

 A. L. Williams, a financial services company now known as Primerica
 Arthur L. Williams, Jr., insurance executive and founder of A. L. Williams
 A. L. Williams (American football) (born 1934), former American football coach

Williams, A. L.